The Dreamer may refer to:

Comics
 The Dreamer (comics), a 1985 semi-autobiographical graphic novel by Will Eisner
 The Dreamer (webcomic), a 2007–2017 comic book series and webcomic by Lora Innes

Film and television
 The Dreamer (1916 film), directed by Alfred Hollingsworth
 The Dreamer (1936 film), a German film directed by Carl Froelich
The Dreamer (1947 film), a Mantan Moreland film
 The Dreamer (1965 film), an Italian film directed by Massimo Franciosa
 The Dreamer (1970 film), an Israeli film directed by Dan Wolman
 The Dreamer (TV series), a 2020 South Korean esports program

Music

Albums
 The Dreamer (Blake Shelton album) or the title song, 2003
 The Dreamer (Etta James album), 2011
 The Dreamer (Jimmy MacCarthy album), 1994
 The Dreamer (José James album) or the title song, 2008
 The Dreamer (Rhett Miller album), 2012
 The Dreamer (Tamyra Gray album), 2004
 The Dreamer (Yusef Lateef album) or the title song, 1959
 The Dreamer, by Mister Speed (Benjamin Speed), 2007

Songs
 "The Dreamer", written by Arthur Schwartz and Frank Loesser for the film Thank Your Lucky Stars, 1943
 "The Dreamer", by Badfinger from Airwaves, 1979
 "The Dreamer", by Neil Sedaka, 1963
 "The Dreamer", by Ryan Sheridan, 2011

Other uses
 The Dreamer (sculpture), a 1979 sculpture by Manuel Izquierdo in Portland, Oregon, US
 The Dreamer: An Autobiography, a 2020 book by Cliff Richard

See also 
 Dreamer (disambiguation)
 The Dreamers (disambiguation)